Leo Rytis Rautins (born March 20, 1960) is a Canadian broadcaster, former professional basketball player and the former head coach of the Canadian men's national basketball team. Rautins played in the National Basketball Association (NBA) drafted in the first round of the 1983 NBA draft, by the Philadelphia 76ers. Rautins' NBA career was waylaid by injury. After a brief retirement, Rautins returned to basketball and played in European professional leagues from 1985 until 1992. He has been a broadcaster for the Toronto Raptors since the team's inception in 1995.

Playing career
Rautins was a star in high school for Toronto's St. Michael's College School. In 1977, at age 16, he was named to the Canadian senior national team, the youngest player in the team's history to that time. He would be a member of the team until 1992. Rautins completed his national team playing career as Canada was eliminated in the 1992 Tournament of the Americas, the basketball qualifying tournament for the Barcelona Olympics.

Rautins attended the University of Minnesota for his freshman year of college, and Syracuse University for three seasons. At Minnesota, Rautins was named first-team All-Big Ten rookie, averaging 8.3 points, 4.1 rebounds, and 3.9 assists a game. He left Minnesota for multiple reasons: at Minnesota, he was not required to attend classes, and at Syracuse he would have the opportunity to be the top player. As a member of the Syracuse Orangemen, he averaged 12.1 points, 5.0 assists, and 6.2 rebounds. He is the first player ever to record a triple-double in Big East play, accomplishing the feat twice in the span of a month during his senior year. He was named All-Big East third team and Honorable Mention All-American that year.

In 1983, Rautins became the second Canadian ever drafted in the first round of the 1983 NBA draft. The  Rautins was selected 17th overall to the Philadelphia 76ers in the 1983 Draft, considered an excellent passer. Unknown to Rautins, he reported to training camp with torn ligaments in his foot which was not treated properly and deteriorated during the season. Hampered by injuries, he played in 28 games as a rookie with the 76ers, averaging just seven minutes a game, 1.5 points, 1 assist, 1.2 rebounds, and 0.7 turnovers. In September 1984, he was traded to the Indiana Pacers for a third-round pick to make room for Charles Barkley under the salary cap but eventually signed as a free agent with the Atlanta Hawks. He played only four games for the Hawks, averaging a mere three minutes a contest and was waived in November 1984. Rautins tried out for other NBA teams and the Continental Basketball Association but was unable to find a spot with another team.

Rautins then left the NBA, returned to Syracuse and did radio and television work. He was a commentator for the Canadian Broadcasting Corporation (CBC) at the 1984 Olympics. In 1985, Rautins returned to playing basketball, moving to Europe. Rautins played in Italy for Serie A1 team Banco Roma (1985–1986) and Serie A2 team Citrosil Verona (1986–1987), in France with Pau Orthez (1989–90 and 1992), and in Spain (1991–92). Rautins then retired from playing. By this time, he had undergone a total of 14 knee operations.

Post-playing career
After retiring from playing, Rautins became a basketball commentator, most notably with the Toronto Raptors since their inaugural season in 1995, serving as either their lead colour commentator (for games on Sportsnet) or studio analyst (for games on TSN). He also conducts basketball camps in the summer.

In 1997, Rautins was inducted into the Canada Basketball Hall of Fame. 

In 2000, Rautins was inducted into the Ontario Basketball Hall of Fame.

In February 2005, Rautins was named head coach of the Canadian National Team. The team did not qualify for the 2008 Olympics, but did qualify for the 2010 World Championship. He resigned from that position in September 2011, after Canada lost to Panama in the FIBA Americas Tournament.

In 2014, Rautins became involved in plans to launch a new Canadian Basketball League. He was named as one of the principals in a proposed Ottawa professional team after the failure of the Ottawa SkyHawks minor professional team. Rautins had been in consideration for the Commissioner position of the National Basketball League of Canada.

On October 17, 2016, Rautins was inducted into the Ontario Sports Hall of Fame at the Sheraton Centre Toronto Hotel.

Personal life
Rautins was born in Toronto, Ontario to a Latvian father and Lithuanian mother. His parents met in a prison camp, from which they escaped with the help of Dutch soldiers, before emigrating to Canada, as it was the only country that would accept them. As a youth, he played for Toronto Aušra, a local sports club for children of Lithuanian descent. Rautins and his first wife Maria had four sons: Michael, Andrew (Andy), Jay and Sammy. Andy followed in his father's footsteps, playing for Syracuse and being drafted by the New York Knicks in 2010. Rautins married Jamie Lawson in 2005. During the NBA offseason, Rautins resides in Jupiter, Florida.

Awards
 1978 – All-Big Ten Rookie Team
 All-Star – Italian, French and Spanish professional leagues
 1997 – Canada's Basketball Hall of Fame
 2000 – Ontario Basketball Hall of Fame
 2000 – Syracuse University All-Century team

References

External links

 Orangehoops.org with a Rautins's profile
 FIBA.com with news of Rautins being hired as Canadian Head Coach
 Profile on Rautins and the other 17 Canadians to play in the NBA

1960 births
Living people
ASVEL Basket players
Atlanta Hawks players
Baloncesto Málaga players
Basketball players from Toronto
Canadian basketball coaches
Canadian expatriate basketball people in France
Canadian expatriate basketball people in Italy
Canadian expatriate basketball people in Spain
Canadian expatriate basketball people in the United States
Canadian men's basketball players
1978 FIBA World Championship players
1982 FIBA World Championship players
Canadian people of Latvian descent
Canadian people of Lithuanian descent
Canadian radio sportscasters
Canadian television sportscasters
Club Ourense Baloncesto players
Élan Béarnais players
Liga ACB players
Minnesota Golden Gophers men's basketball players
National Basketball Association players from Canada
Pallacanestro Virtus Roma players
People from Jupiter, Florida
Philadelphia 76ers draft picks
Philadelphia 76ers players
Scaligera Basket Verona players
Sioux Falls Skyforce (CBA) players
Small forwards
Syracuse Orange men's basketball players
Toronto Raptors announcers